Mummius is a genus of lace bugs in the family Tingidae. There are at least three described species in Mummius.

Species
These three species belong to the genus Mummius:
 Mummius bicorniger Horváth, 1910
 Mummius denigratus Drake, 1954
 Mummius minor Duarte Rodrigues, 1977

References

Further reading

 
 
 
 
 
 
 
 
 
 
 

Tingidae
Articles created by Qbugbot